Lublewo may refer to the following places in Poland:

Lublewo Gdańskie
Lublewo Lęborskie